Luc Malo (born November 2, 1973) is a Canadian politician, who was a Member of Parliament for the riding of Verchères—Les Patriotes from 2006 to 2011. He ran as a member of the Bloc Québécois in the 2006 federal election and won with approximately 57% of the vote. As a member of the Bloc Québécois Shadow Cabinet, he was the Bloc's critic for the Minister of Sport.

Malo was born in Contrecoeur, Quebec, and graduated with a Master of Business Administration degree from the Université de Sherbrooke. From 1996 until 2001, he was an attaché and chief of staff for Stéphane Bergeron, the Member of Parliament (MP) for Verchères—Les Patriotes, then called Verchères. In 2003 and 2004, he continued to serve as an attaché, becoming a research associate for the riding's Member of Parliament in 2005. He presently works as an advisor and business development consultant.

Malo has stated that Hockey Canada never should have hired hockey player Shane Doan because of an alleged slur he made toward French Canadians.

Electoral record (partial)

References

External links
 

1973 births
Bloc Québécois MPs
Living people
Members of the House of Commons of Canada from Quebec
People from Varennes, Quebec
Université de Sherbrooke alumni
21st-century Canadian politicians